Odhneria is a genus of crabs in the family Xanthidae, containing the following species:

 Odhneria acutidens Sakai, 1983
 Odhneria echinus (Alcock, 1898)

References

Xanthoidea